Euphorbia noxia is a species of plant in the family Euphorbiaceae. It is endemic to Somalia, and is threatened by habitat loss.

References

Vulnerable plants
noxia
Endemic flora of Somalia
Taxonomy articles created by Polbot